DWIL (90.7 FM), broadcasting as 90.7 Love Radio, is a radio station owned and operated by Manila Broadcasting Company. The station's studio and transmitter are located at the 6/F Hotel Asuncion Bldg., J.P. Rizal cor. Guerrero St., Brgy. Sta. Marcela, Laoag.

References

External links
Love Radio Laoag FB Page
Love Radio Laoag Website

Radio stations established in 1982
Radio stations in Ilocos Norte